Zoonamchunduru is a village in the state of Andhra Pradesh, India.

Geography

Villages in Guntur district